Mohamed Mady Camara (born 28 February 1997) is a Guinean professional footballer who plays as a central midfielder for Serie A club Roma, on loan from Olympiacos. He also represents the Guinea national team.

Club career

Ajaccio
Camara began his career with Guinean sides Kaloum and Santoba, before training with French Ligue 2 side AC Ajaccio in May 2015. He impressed during his time on trial and signed a professional contract with the club in 2016.

On 20 May 2018, Camara scored a goal in the dying seconds of extra time to tie the game at 2–2 against Havre in the promotion playoffs semifinal. AC Ajaccio won in penalties 5–3, after Ghislain Gimbert scored the decisive penalty.

Olympiacos
On 6 March 2018, he signed a five-year contract with Superleague giants Olympiacos ahead of the 2018–19 season for an undisclosed fee. The cost of the transfer was estimated to €2.5 million. On 16 September 2018, he scored in a 2–1 home win game against Asteras Tripolis.

On 17 February 2019, he scored in a 4–1 home win against champions AEK Athens. On 7 April 2019, he again scored in a 5–0 away win against Panetolikos. On 21 April 2019, Camara opened the scoring for Olympiacos in a 3–1 away win against Lamia, but PAOK's win the same day confirmed that Olympiacos would finish as runners-up behind PAOK.

On 27 October 2019, the 22-year-old Guinean hit the jackpot third time lucky with a powerful shot from the edge of the penalty area which nestled in the top right corner of Panagiotis Tsintotas’ goal in a 2–0 home derby win game against rivals AEK Athens. On 22 January 2020, he scored his only goal in a 1–0 away win against OFI. On 15 June 2020, he scored a brace within two minutes and assisted a goal for Giorgos Masouras, in a 3–1 home victory over Aris for the Superleague championship play-offs.

On 21 July 2021 Camara scored the only goal against Neftçi Baku in a 1-0 home win but was later sent off after a hard foul. On 19 August 2021, he scored with a nice fake shot giving the lead in a thriumphic 3-0 home win 2021–22 UEFA Europa League playoffs 1st round game against ŠK Slovan Bratislava.

Roma
On 31 August 2022, Camara joined Serie A side Roma on a season-long loan, with an option to buy.

International career
Camara made his senior debut for Guinea in a 1–0 2019 Africa Cup of Nations qualification win over Central African Republic on 9 September 2018.

Career statistics

Club

International

Scores and results list Guinea's goal tally first.

Honours

Club
Olympiacos
Super League Greece: 2019–20, 2020–21, 2021–22
Greek Cup: 2019–20; runner-up: 2020–21

Individual
Footballer of the Year in Guinea: 2019–20

References

External links
 
 
 

Living people
1997 births
Association football defenders
Association football midfielders
Guinean footballers
Guinea international footballers
AC Ajaccio players
Olympiacos F.C. players
A.S. Roma players
Ligue 2 players
Super League Greece players
Serie A players
2019 Africa Cup of Nations players
Guinean expatriate footballers
Guinean expatriate sportspeople in France
Expatriate footballers in France
Guinean expatriate sportspeople in Greece
Expatriate footballers in Greece
Guinean expatriate sportspeople in Italy
Expatriate footballers in Italy